Thomas County Courthouse may refer to:

 Thomas County Courthouse (Georgia), Thomasville, Georgia
Thomas County Courthouse (Kansas), Colby, Kansas